Clesson J. Blaisdell (September 28, 1926 – August 26, 1999) was a New Hampshire businessman and politician who served as a member of and President of the New Hampshire Senate.

Family life
Blaisdell had three children, Peter, Michael and Lucinda, with his wife, Beverly, known as Peggy.

Early life
Blaisdell was born to Clesson Blaisdell on September 18, 1926.

Education
Blaisdell graduated from Keene High School.

Military service
From 1944 to 1946, during World War II, Blaisdell served in the United States Navy in the Asiatic/Pacific theater.

State senate
Blaisdell was elected to the New Hampshire Senate fifteen times, and in his fifteenth term he was chosen as the 123rd President of that body. Blaisdell was the first Democrat to be elected President of the state senate since 1912.

Business career
Blaisdell owned and operated a sporting goods store in Keene.

Death
Blaisdell died at the Dartmouth–Hitchcock Medical Center in Lebanon, New Hampshire.

References

1926 births
1999 deaths
United States Navy personnel of World War II
Republican Party New Hampshire state senators
Presidents of the New Hampshire Senate
People from Keene, New Hampshire
20th-century American politicians